The 1998 Tour of the Basque Country was the 38th edition of the Tour of the Basque Country cycle race and was held from 6 April to 10 April 1998. The race started in Hondarribia and finished in Hernani. The race was won by Íñigo Cuesta of the ONCE team.

General classification

References

1998
Bas